Dyschirius salinus is a species of ground beetle in the subfamily Scaritinae. It was described by Schaum in 1843.

References

salinus
Beetles described in 1843